The 2007 Sharpie 500, the 24th race of the 2007 NASCAR Nextel Cup season was run on the newly repaved and reconfigured .533 mile Bristol Motor Speedway in Bristol, Tennessee on Saturday night, August 25, 2007.

This race was the tenth to use NASCAR's Car of Tomorrow, as Kyle Busch won the inaugural event with this car, the Food City 500 on March 25 this year.  But that race was on 36-degree high banked turns and the old concrete surface.  For this race, one of the most popular in NASCAR, the new concrete surface with its new progressive banked turns between 24 and 30 degrees made its NEXTEL Cup debut.

Pre-Race News
Kenny Wallace, who was the driver of the #78 Furniture Row Racing Chevrolet until after the Watkins Glen race, replaced the injured Kyle Petty in the #45 Petty Enterprises Dodge.  Sterling Marlin piloted the #78 car, but did not make the starting lineup.
Aric Almirola made his Nextel Cup debut in the Dale Earnhardt, Inc. #01 Chevrolet.
Matt Kenseth clinched a spot in the Chase for the Nextel Cup by taking the green flag.

Entry list

Qualifying
Kasey Kahne won the pole position on the newly rebanked and resurfaced track.  This was Kahne's 14th start on the point.  Juan Pablo Montoya joined Kahne on the front row; Montoya's second starting position is the best of his NASCAR career so far.

Failed to qualify: David Reutimann (#00), Sterling Marlin (#78), Brian Vickers (#83), Kevin Lepage (#37) and Stanton Barrett (#34).

Race
Carl Edwards won the Sharpie 500 for his second win of 2007 and the sixth of his career.  Together, he and second-place finisher Kasey Kahne led 487 of the race's 500 laps. Kahne alone led 305 of them, more than in any other race in his career.

The rest of the Top 5 finishers were Clint Bowyer, Tony Stewart, and Dale Earnhardt Jr.

Denny Hamlin suffered an engine failure and did not finish. It was the first such occurrence in 53 races.

Owing largely to the new, wider racing surface, there were only nine cautions at a track which typically sees 15 or more in a 500-lap Cup race.  The first of those did not come until lap 127.

Jeff Gordon left with a 359-point lead over Stewart on top of the championship standings. Kurt Busch retained a 158-point lead over Earnhardt Jr. for the 12th and final position in the Chase.  Gordon, Hamlin, Edwards, Matt Kenseth, and Stewart have assured themselves of participation in the NASCAR "playoff."

Race results

References

External links
Complete race results 
Point standings 

Sharpie 500
Sharpie 500
NASCAR races at Bristol Motor Speedway
August 2007 sports events in the United States